The Woody Hayes Athletic Center is an indoor athletics training facility of The Ohio State University. It was dedicated in November 1987 in memory of Woody Hayes, Ohio State's football coach, and renovated in a significant expansion in 2005–2007. The field is used by the football, baseball, softball, lacrosse and soccer teams.

The $21.5 million  expansion was financed by fund-raisers outside the athletic department budget. Heery International of Atlanta, Georgia, provided the architectural design, with emphasis on current technological, media, and innovative developments.

The facility has a  weight room with free weights and Nautilus equipment as well as a training room that is available for Ohio State sports teams.

Football facilities include coaches' offices with individual position meeting rooms, an auditorium for team meetings, meeting rooms for offense and defense units, and a substantial player lounge.

The northern corridor and atrium are adorned with Ohio State Buckeyes football history, including Big Ten and national championship team displays, Heisman Trophies and photos of All-Americans and Academic All-Americans, and is the only part of the facility open to the public.

External links
Map:

References
"Tressel unveils newly renovated facility to reporters" O-Zone.net featured article
Woody Hayes Athletic Center, "OSU has shrine to sweat in", The Columbus Dispatch July 22, 2007
Heery International site description

Ohio State Buckeyes